Hocalı  is a small village in Mut district of  Mersin Province, Turkey. At  its situated to the east of Turkish state highway . The population of Hocalı was only 93  as of 2012. Main economic activity is agriculture. Apricot, plum and olive are the main crops.

References

Villages in Mut District